Steromphala adriatica is a species of sea snail, a marine gastropod mollusk in the family Trochidae, the top snails.

Description
The size of the shell varies between 9 mm and 14 mm. The shell is more solid than Gibbula adansonii, generally paler and the base of the shell is whitish. The spiral sculpture is stronger. The penultimate whorl has about 5 well-marked, separated spiral lirae. The body whorl is angulate at the periphery.

Distribution
This species occurs in the Mediterranean Sea and the Sea of Azov.

References

 Gofas, S.; Le Renard, J.; Bouchet, P. (2001). Mollusca, in: Costello, M.J. et al. (Ed.) (2001). European register of marine species: a check-list of the marine species in Europe and a bibliography of guides to their identification. Collection Patrimoines Naturels, 50: pp. 180–213

External links
 
 Philippi R. A., 1844: Enumeratio molluscorum Siciliae cum viventium tum in tellure tertiaria fossilium, quae in itinere suo observavit. Vol. 2 ; Eduard Anton, Halle [Halis Saxorum iv + 303 p., pl. 13–28]
 Monterosato T. A. (di). (1888-1889). Molluschi del Porto di Palermo. Specie e varietà. Bullettino della Società Malacologica Italiana. 13: 161-180 [15 October 1888; 14: 75-81]
 Nardo, Giovanni Domenico. (1847). Sinonimia moderna delle specie regisrate nell'opera intitolati: descrizione d'crostacei, de testacei e de pesci che abitano le lagune e golfo veneto rappres- sentanti in figure, a chiaroscuro ed a colori dall' Abata Stefano Chiereghini: Venezia, Ven. Clodiense applicata per commissione governativa dal Dr. Gio. Domenico Nardo.
 Deshayes, G.-P. (1835). Mollusques. In: J.-B.-G.-M. Bory de Saint-Vincent (ed.), Expédition scientifique de Morée. Section des sciences physiques. Tome III (1.re Partie). Zoologie. Première section: Des animaux vertébrés. 81-203, pl. 18-26. Paris (F.G. Levrault 
 Anton, H. E. (1838). Verzeichniss der Conchylien welche sich in der Sammlung von Herrmann Eduard Anton befinden. Herausgegeben von dem Besitzer. Halle: Anton. xvi + 110 pp
 Pallary P. (1914). Liste des Mollusques du Golfe de Tunis. Bulletin de la Société d'Histoire Naturelle de l'Afrique du Nord 6(1): 12-27
  Affenzeller S., Haar N. & Steiner G. (2017). Revision of the genus complex Gibbula: an integrative approach to delineating the Eastern Mediterranean genera Gibbula Risso, 1826, Steromphala Gray, 1847, and Phorcus Risso, 1826 using DNA-barcoding and geometric morphometrics (Vetigastropoda, Trochoidea). Organisms Diversity & Evolution. 17(4): 789-812

adriatica
Gastropods described in 1844